William Mitford (1744–1827) was an English historian.

William Mitford may also refer to:

William Mitford (singer-songwriter) (1788–1851), Tyneside songwriter of "The Pitman’s Courtship" and many others
William Townley Mitford (1817–1889), Victorian Conservative Party politician in Britain
William Mitford (c.1369–1423), MP for Northumberland
William Kenyon Mitford (1857–1943), British Army officer, landowner and courtier